Gamble on Love is an American game show which ran on the DuMont Television Network from July 16 to August 20, 1954. The series, originally hosted by Denise Darcel, had three opposite-sex couples competing for a prize.

The series aired Friday nights at 10:30 PM Eastern on most DuMont affiliates. Darcel was replaced on August 6 by comedian Ernie Kovacs, who also hosted the retitled version, Time Will Tell, which started August 27.

Episode status
DuMont, like CBS and NBC during the 1950s, likely kept at least one or two "example" episodes of each of their main game shows, though DuMont's exact policy is not known. However, DuMont's archive was destroyed after the network ceased broadcasting in 1956. Although a small number of episodes of DuMont game shows have surfaced (including episodes of Okay Mother, On Your Way, Blind Date, etc.), none are known to exist of either Gamble on Love nor Time Will Tell.

See also
 List of programs broadcast by the DuMont Television Network
 List of surviving DuMont Television Network broadcasts

References

Bibliography
David Weinstein, The Forgotten Network: DuMont and the Birth of American Television (Philadelphia: Temple University Press, 2004) 
Alex McNeil, Total Television, Fourth edition (New York: Penguin Books, 1980) 
Tim Brooks and Earle Marsh, The Complete Directory to Prime Time Network TV Shows, Third edition (New York: Ballantine Books, 1964)

External links
 
 DuMont historical website

Black-and-white American television shows
DuMont Television Network original programming
English-language television shows
1950s American game shows
1954 American television series debuts
1954 American television series endings
Lost television shows